Purdil Nagar is a town and a notified area council in Hathras district in the Indian state of Uttar Pradesh.

Demographics
 India census, Purdilnagar had a population of 19,039. Males constitute 54% of the population and females 46%. Purdilnagar has an average literacy rate of 48%, lower than the national average of 59.5%: male literacy is 58%, and female literacy is 37%. In Purdilnagar, 28% of the population is under 6 years of age.

References

Cities and towns in Hathras district